Single point is a point category in Canadian football.

Single point may also refer to:

 Any machining process employing a single-point cutting tool, including:
 Single-point thread cutting—a method of threading (manufacturing)
 Single-point diamond turning which uses diamond because it is extremely hard
 Single-point, underwing aviation fueling
 Single-point urban interchange, a type of highway interchange
 SinglePoint, address management software